Franco Del Prete (5 November 1943 – 13 February 2020) was an Italian drummer and lyricist.

Biography
Born in Frattamaggiore, Del Prete was one of the founders of the groups The Showmen, Napoli Centrale, and Sud Express. He also worked as a lyricist for Lucio Dalla, Peppino di Capri, James Senese, Eduardo De Crescenzo, Tullio De Piscopo, Enzo Avitabile and Sal da Vinci.

Discography

With The Showmen
The Showmen (1969)
Showmen 2 (1972)

With Napoli Centrale
Napoli Centrale (1975)
Mattanza (1976)
Qualcosa ca nu' mmore (1978)
Zitte! Sta venenn' 'o mammone (2001)
'O sanghe (2016)

With Sud Express
L'ultimo apache (2009)
La chiave (2018)

Collaborations
Ha tutte le carte in regola (with Gino Paoli) (1980)
Cante jondo (with Eduardo De Crescenzo) (1991)
Danza danza (with Eduardo De Crescenzo) (1993)
Sal da Vinci (with Sal da Vinci) (1994)
Un po' di noi (with Sal da Vinci) (1996)
Solo (with Sal da Vinci) (1998)
Fase 3 (with Peppino di Capri) (2001)
Radice (with Enzo Gragnianiello and Sud Express) (2011)

References

1943 births
2020 deaths
Italian drummers
Male drummers
20th-century drummers
20th-century Italian male musicians